The Wright Cadet was a low floor midibus body built on the DAF/VDL SB120 chassis by Wrightbus between 2000 and 2006. It was sold via VDL dealer Arriva Bus & Coach. Of the 681 produced, 366 were for Arriva subsidiaries including eight for its Netherlands subsidiary. Bus Éireann purchased 35.

Volvo Merit
The SB120/Cadet combination was also sold through Volvo Buses for a time following the withdrawal from sale of its own B6BLE chassis in 2002 without a direct replacement. Cadets sold through Volvo were marketed as the Volvo Merit, although they were identical to Cadets sold through Wrightbus.

References

External links

Low-floor buses
Midibuses
Vehicles introduced in 2000
Cadet